Josef Bazal (born 6 November 1993) is a professional Czech football winger currently playing for FK Viktoria Žižkov.

He made his senior league debut for Viktoria Žižkov on 9 March 2014 in a Czech National Football League 1–2 home loss against Sokolov. He scored his first league goals on 24 June in Žižkov's 2–0 away win at Pardubice.

External links 
 
 
 Josef Bazal profile on the SK Slavia Prague official website

Czech footballers
1993 births
Living people
Czech First League players
SK Slavia Prague players
FK Jablonec players
FK Viktoria Žižkov players
FC Vysočina Jihlava players
Association football midfielders
1. FK Příbram players
Czech National Football League players
People from Znojmo
Sportspeople from the South Moravian Region
Bohemian Football League players